The 1934–35 season was the 60th season of competitive football in England. Arsenal became only the second team to win the League three consecutive times after Huddersfield Town who were the first to achieve this in the 1920s under the same manager Herbert Chapman.

Honours

Notes = Number in parentheses is the times that club has won that honour. * indicates new record for competition

Football League

First Division

Second Division

Third Division North

Third Division South

Top goalscorers

First Division
Ted Drake (Arsenal) – 42 goals

Second Division
Jack Milsom (Bolton Wanderers) – 31 goals

Third Division North
Gilbert Alsop (Walsall) – 39 goals

Third Division South
Ralph Allen (Charlton Athletic) – 32 goals

References